Alexis Joyce (born September 5, 1983) is an American sprinter who specialized in the 100 metres.

In 60 metres she finished eighth at the 2008 IAAF World Indoor Championships.

Her personal best time over 100 m is 11.45 seconds, achieved in April 2001 in Denver. Her personal best time over 60 m is 7.21 seconds, achieved in February 2008 in Boston.

References
 

1983 births
Living people
American female sprinters
21st-century American women
Place of birth missing (living people)